Vikhirevo is a rural locality (a village) in Chertkovskoye Rural Settlement, Selivanovsky District, Vladimir Oblast, Russia. The population was 6 as of 2010.

Geography 
Vikhirevo is located on the Tetrukh River, 16 km northeast of Krasnaya Gorbatka (the district's administrative centre) by road. Yekaterinovka is the nearest rural locality.

References 

Rural localities in Selivanovsky District